Basketball Elchingen 1999, for sponsorship reasons Scanplus Baskets Elchingen, is a German professional basketball club, based in Elchingen. The club currently plays in the ProB, the German third tier division. Until 1999, the team was known as SV Oberelchingen.

In 2018, Elchingen was crowned the ProB champions after defeating Rostock Seawolves in the finals of the playoffs. However, the team resigned its position to promote to the second-tier ProA.

Honours
ProB
Champions (1): 2017–18

European record

References

Basketball teams in Germany